How Does It Feel to Be Loved? (often abbreviated to HDIF) is a London-based nightclub which predominantly plays indie pop, Northern Soul and Motown music. On the club's website, founder Ian Watson explains: "We love pop, we love guitars that jangle, we love foot stomping melodies and huge choruses." The club's name is taken from the lyrics to The Velvet Underground song "Beginning to See the Light".

History
Watson, a former Melody Maker journalist, began the night in April 2002 at The Buffalo Bar in Islington.

HDIF takes place on the third Saturday of the month at The Phoenix in Marylebone, central London. Over the years, HDIF has taken place in a variety of venues in the capital, including the 100 Club on Oxford Street, The Canterbury Arms, The Windmill and Jamm in Brixton, Buffalo Bar in Highbury, The Grosvenor in Stockwell, Nambucca in Archway, The Shacklewell Arms in Dalston, The Crypt in Camberwell and the Montague Arms in Peckham. It ran from 2003 to 2015 at the Canterbury Arms, and was "Brixton's longest running indie club night".

Press for the HDIF has been extremely positive. "Legendary indie club," said the NME. "Much-loved indie pop institution," wrote The Quietus. "With a decade of great nights under its belt How Does it Feel to Be Loved? is one of London's most enduring and influential underground indie get-togethers," said Flavorpill.  "A speakeasy for anyone who suspects that their life is one big Smiths song," declared Big Issue. In January 2015, it was named one of "London's best indie nights" by Time Out.

Notable DJs
Guest DJs have included:
 Belle & Sebastian's Stuart Murdoch
 The Smiths producer Stephen Street
 The Wedding Present's David Gedge
 Camera Obscura singer Tracyanne Campbell and bass player Gavin Dunbar
 Felt singer Lawrence
 Teenage Fanclub's Norman Blake
 Dexys Midnight Runners singer Kevin Rowland
 Dan Treacy of the Television Personalities
 St Etienne's Bob Stanley
 Jon Slade of Huggy Bear/Comet Gain
 Darren Hayman
 Paul Court of The Primitives
 The Clientele singer Alasdair Maclean
 Amelia Fletcher of Talulah Gosh
 Theaudience founder Billy Reeves
 Chelsea and Everton footballer Pat Nevin
 The Pains of Being Pure at Heart
 Jeffrey Lewis

HDIF started running online Virtual Dance Parties in March 2020, with a DJ set streamed to mixlr and to a VR recreation of the Canterbury Arms hosted on Altspace. The following have DJ-ed at the virtual dance parties: Stuart Murdoch, Stevie Jackson and Chris Geddes of Belle & Sebastian, Stephin Merritt of The Magnetic Fields, Tracyanne Campbell of Camera Obscura, Jeffrey Lewis, Elizabeth Morris and Bill Botting of Allo Darlin', David Gedge of The Wedding Present, Amelia Fletcher of Talulah Gosh and Heavenly, Helen Love, Bobby Wratten of The Field Mice, Jim Reid of The Jesus and Mary Chain, Estella Adeyeri of Big Joanie, John Dwyer of Osees, comedians Josie Long and Stewart Lee, The Lovely Eggs, Huw Williams of The Pooh Sticks, Gail O'Hara of Chickfactor, Kip Berman of The Pains Of Being Pure At Heart, Manda Rin of Bis, Martin Phillipps of The Chills, Norman Blake of Teenage Fanclub, Lloyd Cole, Duglas T Stewart of BMX Bandits, Wendy Pickles of The Popguns, Darren Hayman, Black Francis of Pixies, Beth Arzy of Jetstream Pony, Robert Lloyd of The Nightingales, Franic Rozycki of The Wave Pictures, Stephen McRobbie of The Pastels, Liz Stokes of The Beths, Ian Parton of The Go! Team, and Sean Tollefson of Tullycraft.

Live shows
Since July 2005, HDIF has promoted live shows under the HDIF Presents banner. Bands featured have included:
 Sambassadeur
 Language of Flowers
 Saturday Looks Good to Me
 Lucky Soul
 Fanfarlo
 The Gresham Flyers
 Darren Hayman
 Tilly And The Wall
 Fosca
 Irene
 I'm From Barcelona
 Butcher Boy
 Brontosaurus Chorus
 Allo Darlin'
 This Many Boyfriends
 Cats on Fire
 The Band of Holy Joy
 A Fine Day for Sailing
 White Town
 Standard Fare
 Shrag
 Veronica Falls
 The Lodger
 God Help the Girl 
 The Popguns
 The Pooh Sticks

Label
In September 2006, HDIF's spin-off record label was launched with the release of the 19-track compilation The Kids At The Club  and featured many of the acts who had played or DJ'd at HDIF nights.

The label has since gone on to release albums by Butcher Boy, Saturday Looks Good To Me, Antarctica Takes It!, Cats On Fire and Pocketbooks.

In June 2010, the first HDIF Podcast was recorded. Featuring songs played at the most recent club night, it featured the club's trademark mixture of indiepop and soul.

In December 2010, HDIF was part of the line up for Bowlie 2, the music festival curated by Belle & Sebastian.

In July 2011, the anthropologist Wendy Fonarow cited HDIF in her Indie Professor column in The Guardian. Discussing the differences between American and British indie music, she commented: "Indie is the diminutive of independent and often has names that are self-conscious, small and innocent: Sarah, Heavenly, Postcard, Fierce Panda, Mute or How Does it Feel to Be Loved?"

From 2011 onwards, HDIF has been part of the line up for the End of the Road Festival, playing two sets: one in the afternoon for children at the Forest Disco, and a late night one for adults.

Elizabeth Morris of Allo Darlin' stated in an interview in the 2011 End of the Road Festival programme that the band's initial ambition was to have one of their songs played at HDIF. She later revealed: "This club inspired a lot of our songs, including 'Dreaming' and 'Polaroid Song'."

After a break of three years, the HDIF label was revived in 2013, with the release of the debut album by Haiku Salut, titled Tricolore. The label released Haiku Salut's second album, "Etch and Etch Deep", in 2015.

References

External links
Official website
HDIF record label
Indie Travel Guide - HDIF guide to indie scenes around the world
Guardian Unlimited feature on indie pop
Observer feature on indie pop

Nightclubs in London
British record labels
Record labels established in 2006
British independent record labels
Indie pop record labels